USS Somerset may refer to:

 , a side wheel ferryboat launched and purchased in 1862 and sold in 1865; the rejuvenated Somerset began a career as a New York ferryboat until 1914
 USS Somerset (ID-2162), a Maryland State Fisheries Force motor boat that served in World War I
 , a  launched in April 2012

United States Navy ship names